The following are the winners of the 10th annual ENnie Awards, held in 2010:

Gold and Silver Winners

External links
 Official ENnie Awards Website
 Official ENnie Awards Blog

2010 awards
2010 in the United States
2010